The Green Homes Grant was a British government scheme to subsidise the cost of energy efficient home improvements in England.

Overview 
Under the Green Homes Grant, Homeowners or residential landlords in England could apply for a voucher towards the cost of installing energy efficient improvements to their home.

The vouchers covered up to two-thirds of the cost of eligible improvements, up to a maximum government contribution of £5,000. If someone in the household was in receipt of certain benefits then the household could be eligible for a voucher covering 100% of the cost of the improvements, up to a maximum government contribution of £10,000. Landlords were not eligible for the higher low income voucher.

History 
The scheme was announced by Chancellor Rishi Sunak during the July 2020 Summer Statement. A total of £2 billion was earmarked for the scheme.

In November 2020, the Prime Minister Boris Johnson announced the scheme would be extended for an extra year, until the end of March 2022.

The scheme closed to new applications at the end of March 2021.

Criticism

Environmental Audit Committee report 
In March 2021, the House of Commons Environmental Audit Committee released a report into the government’s progress on energy efficiency measures, titled 'Energy Efficiency of Existing Homes'.

See also 
 Energy policy of the United Kingdom
 Energy efficiency in British housing
 The Green Deal

References

External links 

 

Energy policy of the United Kingdom
Energy conservation in the United Kingdom
Climate change in the United Kingdom
2020 in the United Kingdom